Hoàng Ấu Phương, also known by the pen name Bảo Ninh (born 18 October 1952), is a Vietnamese novelist, essayist and writer of short stories, best known for his first novel, published in English as The Sorrow of War.

Vietnam war

Ninh recounted that American bombing raids during the Vietnam War, beginning in 1965 when he was 12-13, destroyed ordinary people's homes and upended their lives. Ninh stated that his own school in Hanoi was relocated as a result of the bombing, which inspired him to anger rather than fear. Ninh stated that Americans entering Vietnam were viewed as no different from earlier French colonizers, and that he inherited this view himself from his parents.

During the war Ninh served in the Glorious 27th Youth Brigade, joining when he was 17 years old. He stated that the Vietnamese people who fought against the Americans were not specifically fighting for Marxism, but rather fighting to bring peace for their country. Hunger was a frequent problem for Ninh and his fellow soldiers, who often moved back and forth from their homes to the battlefields. Of the five hundred who went to war with the brigade in 1969, Ninh is one of ten who survived.

Ninh described the fear caused among Vietnamese soldiers by American airpower while in combat during the war:

Ninh later called the war "fratricide" fueled by American firepower. "In war, no one wins or loses. There is only destruction."

Author

In 1987, Bảo Ninh published Trại bảy chú lùn (Camp of Seven Dwarves), a collection of short stories. He has also written a second novel, Steppe, but is said to be reluctant to publish it.

A short story by Bảo Ninh, "A Marker on the Side of the Boat" (Khắc dấu mạn thuyền), translated by Linh Dinh, is included in the anthology Night, Again.

Bảo Ninh is also a successful essayist. He is interviewed in Ken Burns's series The Vietnam War.

Works
 The Sorrow of War - 1990
 Hanoi At No Time - 2003
 Rambling while stuck in traffic - 2005
 Are old stories true? - 2009
 Selected writings - 2011
 Short story - 2013

References

Palmos, Frank, Ridding the Devils, Bantam, Sydney, London 1990. 

1952 births
Living people
North Vietnamese military personnel of the Vietnam War
People from Quảng Bình province
Vietnamese novelists
Vietnamese writers
Vietnamese-language writers
Winners of the Nikkei Asia Prize